Boyd is an unincorporated community in Eureka Township, Barton County, Kansas, United States.

History
Boyd was a station and shipping point on the Missouri Pacific Railroad.

References

Further reading

External links
 Barton County maps: Current, Historic, KDOT

Unincorporated communities in Barton County, Kansas
Unincorporated communities in Kansas